Ariston is a genus of cribellate orb-weavers first described by Octavius Pickard-Cambridge in 1896.

Species
 it contains five species:
Ariston aglasices Salvatierra, Tourinho & Brescovit, 2014 — Mexico
Ariston albicans O. Pickard-Cambridge, 1896 — Mexico to Panama
Ariston aristus Opell, 1979 — Panama
Ariston mazolus Opell, 1979 — Mexico
Ariston spartanus Salvatierra, Tourinho & Brescovit, 2014 — Brazil

References

External links

Araneomorphae genera
Uloboridae